Kemp is a brittle, weak fibre forming the residual traces of a secondary coat in some breeds of sheep, which may be mixed with normal fibres in a wool fleece. This hair is not desirable in a fleece, as it does not accept dye, minimising both the quality and the value of the wool.

References

Sheep wool
Spinning